The Papua New Guinea national cricket team, nicknamed the Barramundis, is the team that represents the country of Papua New Guinea in international cricket. The team is organised by Cricket PNG, which has been an Associate Member of the International Cricket Council (ICC) since 1973. Papua New Guinea previously had One-Day International (ODI) status, which it gained by finishing fourth in 2014 World Cup Qualifier. Papua New Guinea lost both their ODI and T20I status in March 2018 after losing a playoff match against Nepal during the 2018 Cricket World Cup Qualifier, a result that earned ODI and T20I status for their opponents. On 26 April 2019, PNG defeated Oman to finish to scure a top-four finish in the 2019 ICC World Cricket League Division Two and reclaim their ODI status.

Papua New Guinea is the strongest team in the ICC East Asia-Pacific region, winning most ICC regional tournaments and having a similar record in the cricket tournament at the Pacific Games. The team has also played in every edition of the World Cup Qualifier (previously the ICC Trophy). Papua New Guinea holds the world record for the highest score in a one-day match, making 572/7 against New Caledonia in 2007.

In April 2018, the ICC decided to grant full Twenty20 International (T20I) status to all its Members. Therefore, all Twenty20 matches played between Papua New Guinea and other ICC members since 1 January 2019 have been a full T20I.

History

Beginnings

Cricket was introduced to the Territory of Papua by missionaries in the 1890s, and the local population soon took up the game. Matches were not always played to strict rules, with teams of more than fifty players a common occurrence. Cricket did not arrive in the Territory of New Guinea until Australia took over the administration of the territory under a United Nations mandate.

Cricket in rural areas tended to be played mostly by the indigenous population, whilst in urban areas such as Port Moresby the game was played mostly by the British and Australian expatriate population, and a competition for clubs in the city was started in 1937. A team of nine expatriate and two indigenous players played in Papua New Guinea's first international, against Australia in 1972.

Since its beginnings cricket was picked up naturally in the Motuan areas of Papua New Guinea, most recognisably the village of Hanuabada. Hanuabada village is located on the outer suburbs of Port Moresby, here cricket is played everyday from small children to their national stars, every afternoon the streets are flooded with boys playing cricket, this was also where the Liklik Kricket Competition was started in PNG. It may be for these reasons more than half of the PNG national cricket team is from Hanuabada village.

ICC Membership

Papua New Guinea became an associate member of the ICC in 1973, shortly before the country gained independence in 1975. The West Indies cricket team visited the country that year, beating the national side by four wickets. The team for that match contained six indigenous players, and from this point on, indigenous players began to dominate the national team.

They played in the first ICC Trophy in 1979, though they failed to progress beyond the first round. They won the gold medal at the first South Pacific Games cricket tournament later in the year and have won the gold medal every time since. After a tour of Australia in 1981, Papua New Guinea had their best international performance in the 1982 ICC Trophy where they finished third after beating Bangladesh in a play-off.

Papua New Guinea again failed to progress beyond the first round at the 1986 ICC Trophy, though they did record the highest total in the tournament's history in their match against Gibraltar. They bounced back to win the gold medal at the South Pacific Games in New Caledonia the following year. They reached the second round of the 1990 ICC Trophy in the Netherlands and the gold medal when they hosted the South Pacific Games in 1991.

They reached the plate final of the 1994 ICC Trophy, but did not play the match as they had already booked a flight home, not expecting to qualify. This has been an occasional problem for Papua New Guinea, as flights to and from the country are infrequent. They also left the 1998 ACC Trophy in Nepal early after losing their first two games, forfeiting their match against the Maldives as otherwise they would have had to have waited more than a week for the next flight. This has also meant they have rarely played overseas outside of official tournaments, the only exceptions being a visit to Fiji in 1977, a tour of Hong Kong in the early 1980s and the aforementioned tour of Australia.

Modern era

Another international outlet for Papua New Guinea team opened up in 1996 when they participated in the first ACC Trophy in Kuala Lumpur. They reached the semi-final, where they lost to Bangladesh. They played in the tournament again in 1998, but left the tournament early. They have not played in the tournament since due to the establishment of the ICC's East Asia/Pacific development region. In-between the two ACC Trophy tournaments, Papua New Guinea finished 13th in the 1997 ICC Trophy. They failed to progress beyond the first round of the 2001 tournament in Ontario. They finished third in the 2001 Pacifica Cup and won the same event in 2002, beating Tonga in the final.

They again won the gold medal at cricket tournament of the 2003 South Pacific Games, and in 2005 played in the repêchage tournament of the 2005 ICC Trophy. They won the tournament after beating regional rivals Fiji in the final. This qualified them for the 2005 ICC Trophy, where they finished 11th. In 2007, Papua New Guinea played in Division Three of the World Cricket League in Darwin where they finished third. They played in the cricket tournament of the 2007 South Pacific Games, where they again won the gold medal.

In late January 2009, Papua New Guinea travelled to Buenos Aires to take part in Division Three of the World Cricket League where they played Argentina, the Cayman Islands, Uganda and the top two teams from Division Four in 2008. A top two finish in this tournament would have qualified them for the 2009 ICC World Cup Qualifier in South Africa later in 2009, from which they could have qualified for the 2011 World Cup. Papua New Guinea narrowly missed qualification, ending up in third place behind Afghanistan and Uganda.

It was third time lucky for Papua New Guinea when they contested Division Three of the World Cricket League in January 2011. Winning their first 4 matches of the tournament, they had assured themselves a top two finish, before losing the final round robin match and then the final, both against Hong Kong.

In April 2011, Papua New Guinea took part in Division Two of the World Cricket League, held in the United Arab Emirates and came third, thus qualifying for the 2014 Cricket World Cup Qualifier in New Zealand.

In February 2013, Papua New Guinea travelled to Auckland, New Zealand, for the EAP Championship and went through the group stages unbeaten before defeating Vanuatu in the final. As a result, they participated in the 2013 ICC World Twenty20 Qualifier in the UAE in October.

ODI and T20I status
Papua New Guinea finished 4th in the final qualifying tournament for the 2015 ICC Cricket World Cup, in New Zealand in 2014.  While missing out on qualification for the World Cup, their final position allowed them to gain One Day International (ODI) status for the first time. By having ODI status, the International Cricket Council (ICC) also granted Papua New Guinea Twenty20 International (T20I) status.

The team played their first ODI match in a two-match series against Hong Kong in Australia in November 2014.
 
They won the first by 4 wickets, the second by 3 wickets. As on date (November-2016), they are the only country that has won its first two ODIs.

Papua New Guinea's first scheduled T20I match was against Hong Kong on 13 July 2015 at the 2015 ICC World Twenty20 Qualifier. However the match was abandoned without a ball bowled due to rain, with no toss taking place. They played their first full match two days later, against Ireland, beating them by 2 wickets. With their victory against Nepal on 17 July, they became the first team to qualify for the play-off section of the tournament.

Papua New Guinea crashed out early from the race of qualification for the 2016 ICC World Twenty20 slated to be held in India. They finished eighth during the ICC World Twenty20 Qualifier in Ireland and Scotland.

In September 2017, then team coach Jason Gillespie suggested that Papua New Guinea should be added to the Australian domestic limited-overs cricket tournament.

Papua New Guinea has qualified for 2021 ICC Men's T20 World Cup to be held in India.

On the 30th of March 2021, it was announced that Carl Sandri was appointed as the new national coach and high performance manager for all three national squads and will oversee the high performance department and the development of talent in PNG.

Papua New Guinea Cricket Board

Papua New Guinea Cricket Board is the official governing body of the sport of cricket in Papua New Guinea. Its current headquarters is in Port Moresby, Papua New Guinea. Papua New Guinea Cricket Board is Papua New Guinea's representative at the International Cricket Council and is an associate member and has been a member of that body since 1973. It is also a member of the East Asia-Pacific Cricket Council.

Home ground

Amini Park

Amini Park is a cricket ground in Port Moresby, Papua New Guinea. 
The ground is named for the Amini family, several of whom have played cricket for Papua New Guinea, and has seen the men's team play Australia, the West Indies and Victoria.

The women's team played Japan in a three match series at the ground in September 2006.

Current squad
This lists all the players who have played for Papua New Guniea in the past 12 months or has been part of the latest ODI or T20I squad. Updated as of 17 July 2022.

Coaching history
c. 2007:  Api Leka
2009–2011:  Andy Bichel
2011:  Rarua Dikana (interim)
2011–2012:  Brad Hogg
2012-2014:  Peter Anderson
2014:  Rarua Dikana (interim)
2014–2017:  Dipak Patel
2017:  Jason Gillespie (interim)
2018–2021:  Joe Dawes
2021–2022:  Carl Sandri
2022:  Mark Coles (interim)

Tournament history

ICC Cricket World Cup

ICC Cricket World Cup Qualifier (ICC Trophy)

1979: First round
1982: 3rd place
1986: First round
1990: Second round
1994: Reached plate final but did not take part
1997: 13th place
2001: First round
2005: 11th place
2009: Did not qualify
2014: 4th place
2018: 9th place
2023: TBD

ICC T20 World Cup

ICC T20 World Cup Qualifier

2012: 8th place
2013: 8th place
2015: 8th Place
2019: Runners-up
2022: 3rd place

ICC World Cricket League

2007: Division Three 3rd place
2009: Division Three 3rd place
2011: Division Three 2nd place
2011: Division Two 3rd place
2019: Division Two 3rd place

ICC EAP Cricket Trophy

2009: 1st place
2011: 1st place
2013: 1st place

Pacifica Cup

2001: 3rd place
2002: Winners

(South) Pacific Games

1979: Gold medal
1987: Gold medal
1991: Gold medal
2003: Gold medal
2007: Gold medal
2011: Gold medal
2015: Silver medal
2019: Gold medal

ACC Trophy

1996: Semi-final
1998: First round
2000 onwards: Not taken part as now part of the East Asia/Pacific region

Records and statistics of international matches
International match summary – Papua New Guinea

Last updated 15 March 2023

One-Day Internationals
Highest team total: 292/8 v. Nepal, 25 March 2022 at Tribhuvan University International Cricket Ground, Kirtipur
Highest individual score: 151, Tony Ura v. Ireland, 6 March 2018 at Harare Sports Club, Harare
Best individual bowling figures: 6/41, Chad Soper v. Hong Kong, 6 November 2016 at Mission Road Ground, Mong Kok

Most ODI runs for Papua New Guinea

Most ODI wickets for Papua New Guinea

ODI record versus other nations

Records complete to ODI #4536. Last updated 15 March 2023.

Twenty20 Internationals
Highest team total: 216/4 v. Philippines, 22 March 2019 at Amini Park, Port Moresby
Highest individual score: 107*, Tony Ura v. Philippines, 23 March 2019 at Amini Park, Port Moresby
Best innings bowling: 5/15, Damien Ravu v. Vanuatu, on 9 July 2019 at Faleata Oval No 3, Apia.

Most T20I runs for Papua New Guinea

Most T20I wickets for Papua New Guinea

T20I record versus other nations

Records complete to T20I #1667. Last updated 17 July 2022.

Other records and statistics

First-class matches

Most first-class runs: Assad Vala 559
Most first-class wickets: Norman Vanua 16
Highest individual score: Assad Vala 144* v. Namibia, 16–19 October 2016
Highest team score: 311 v. Namibia, 16–19 October 2016
Best bowling (innings): Loa Nou 5/49 v. Netherlands, 16–18 June 2015
Best bowling (match): Lega Siaka 7/54 v. Namibia, 16–19 October 2016

ICC Trophy
Highest team total: 455/9 v. Gibraltar, 18 June 1986 (Tournament record)
Highest individual score: 162 by T Souter v. Israel, 20 June 1986
Best innings bowling: 5/12 by W Maha v. Gibraltar, 18 June 1986

Overall

Highest team total: 572/7 v. New Caledonia, 31 August 2007 (world record)
Highest individual score: 162 by B Harry v. Israel, 20 June 1986
Best innings bowling: 8/27 by Mea Steven v. New Hebrides, 1979

See also
 Papua New Guinea national women's cricket team
 Papua New Guinea Under-19 cricket team
 Papua New Guinea ODI cricketers
 Papua New Guinea T20I cricketers

Notes

References

Cricket in Papua New Guinea
National cricket teams
Cricket
Papua New Guinea in international cricket